Crawford Run is a  long 1st order tributary to the Youghiogheny River in Allegheny County, Pennsylvania.

Course
Crawford Run rises about 0.75 miles southwest of Hahntown, Pennsylvania, and then flows west and southwest barely into Allegheny County to join the Youghiogheny River at Robbins.

Watershed
Crawford Run drains  of area, receives about 39.4 in/year of precipitation, has a wetness index of 329.07, and is about 54% forested.

References

 
Tributaries of the Ohio River
Rivers of Pennsylvania
Rivers of Westmoreland County, Pennsylvania
Allegheny Plateau